Randy Wayne Schekman (born December 30, 1948) is an American cell biologist at the University of California, Berkeley, former editor-in-chief of Proceedings of the National Academy of Sciences and former editor of Annual Review of Cell and Developmental Biology. In 2011, he was announced as the editor of eLife, a new high-profile open-access journal published by the Howard Hughes Medical Institute, the Max Planck Society and the Wellcome Trust launching in 2012.  He was elected to the National Academy of Sciences in 1992. Schekman shared the 2013 Nobel Prize for Physiology or Medicine with James Rothman and Thomas C. Südhof for their ground-breaking work on cell membrane vesicle trafficking.

Early life and education
Schekman was born in Saint Paul, Minnesota, to Alfred Schekman, an electrical engineer and computer software designer and Esther (Bader) Schekman. His family were Jewish emigrants from Russia and Bessarabia. In the late 1950s his family moved to the new suburban community of Rossmoor, located in Orange County next to Long Beach.  He graduated from Western High School in Anaheim, California, in 1966.  He received a BA in Molecular Biology from the University of California in Los Angeles (UCLA), in 1971. He spent his third year at the University of Edinburgh in Scotland, as an exchange student. He received a PhD in 1975 from Stanford University for research on DNA replication working with Arthur Kornberg. After joining the faculty at University of California, Berkeley, he was promoted to Associate Professor in 1981 and Professor in 1984.

Research and career
Since 1991, Schekman has been a Howard Hughes Medical Institute Investigator, Division of Biochemistry and Molecular Biology, Department of Molecular and Cell Biology, at the University of California, Berkeley.  The Schekman Lab at that university carries out research into molecular descriptions of the process of membrane assembly and vesicular traffic in eukaryotic cells including yeast. Before that, he was a faculty member with the now disbanded Department of Biochemistry at the same university.

Awards and honors
In 1987 Schekman received the Eli Lilly Award in Microbiology.  In 1992, Schekman was elected a Member of the National Academy of Sciences. In 2002, Schekman received the Albert Lasker Award for Basic Medical Research and Louisa Gross Horwitz Prize of Columbia University along with James Rothman for their discovery of cellular membrane trafficking, a process that cells use to organize their activities and communicate with their environment. In 2008 he was named the first Miller Senior Fellow of the Miller Institute at the University of California Berkeley. That same year, he was elected to the American Philosophical Society. He was awarded the Massry Prize from the Keck School of Medicine, University of Southern California, in 2010. Schekman serves as a member of the Selection Committee and then as chair of Life Science and Medicine which chooses winners of the Shaw Prize.

Schekman was elected a Foreign Member of the Royal Society (ForMemRS) in 2013.  His nomination reads:

Schekman, Thomas C. Südhof, and James Rothman were awarded the 2013 Nobel Prize for Physiology or Medicine "for their discoveries of machinery regulating vesicle traffic, a major transport system in our cells". Schekman donated his share of the prize money, $400,000, to create an endowment for the Esther and Wendy Schekman Chair in Basic Cancer Biology at UC Berkeley. Schekman's mother and sister, for whom the post is named, both died of cancer.

In 2017, Schekman received the Golden Plate Award of the American Academy of Achievement.

Open-access science
In December 2013, Schekman called for academic journal publishing reform and open access science publication by announcing that his lab at the University of California, Berkeley would no longer submit to the prestigious closed-access journals Nature, Cell, and Science, citing their self-serving and deleterious effects on science. He has criticized these journals for artificially restricting the number of publications accepted to drive up demand. In addition, Schekman says the journals accept papers that will be cited often, increasing the prestige of the journal, rather than those which demonstrate important results. Schekman has said the prestige and difficulty of publishing in these journals sometimes cause scientists to cut corners or pursue trends, rather than conduct research on important questions. Schekman is the former editor of eLife, an open access journal and competitor to Nature, Cell, and Science. Papers are accepted into eLife based on review by working scientists. Access to accepted papers is free.

References

External links
 

1948 births
Living people
Nobel laureates in Physiology or Medicine
American Nobel laureates
American biochemists
Foreign Members of the Royal Society
Howard Hughes Medical Investigators
Jewish American scientists
Members of the United States National Academy of Sciences
Recipients of the Albert Lasker Award for Basic Medical Research
Alumni of the University of Edinburgh
Stanford University alumni
University of California, Berkeley College of Letters and Science faculty
University of California, Los Angeles alumni
Massry Prize recipients
Open access activists
Proceedings of the National Academy of Sciences of the United States of America editors